Ohr Somayach (also Or Samayach or Ohr Somayach International) is a yeshiva based in Jerusalem founded in 1970 catering mostly to young Jewish men, usually of college age, who are already interested in learning about Judaism. It is known as a "baal teshuva" yeshiva since it caters to Jews with little or no background in Judaism, but with an interest in studying the classic texts such as the Talmud and responsa. Students are recruited either locally or from other countries where the yeshiva has established branches, such as in the United States, Canada, South Africa, United Kingdom, Australia, Ukraine and Russia.

History
In 1970, Rabbis Noah Weinberg, Mendel Weinbach, Nota Schiller, and Yaakov Rosenberg, founded Shema Yisrael Yeshiva to attract young Jewish men with little or no background in Jewish studies. The founders of the Yeshiva eventually parted ways due to differences in philosophy of teaching with Rabbi Weinberg founding Aish HaTorah in 1974 and Rabbi Rosenberg founding Machon Shlomo in 1982.

In 1973, Shema Yisrael changed its name to Ohr Somayach, the title of a commentary on the Mishneh Torah written by Rabbi Meir Simcha of Dvinsk.

Notable faculty
Rabbi Yitzchak Breitowitz, rav of the kehila
Rabbi Nota Schiller, rosh yeshiva
Rabbi Mendel Weinbach, rosh yeshiva (deceased) 
Rabbi Aharon Feldman, rosh yeshiva
Rabbi Nachman Bulman, mashgiach ruchani 
Rabbi Dovid Gottlieb, a former professor of analytical philosophy at Johns Hopkins University
Rabbi Dovid Kaplan, author of The Kiruv Files and the Impact! series

Notable alumni
 	
 Moses Michael Levi Barrow (born Jamal Michael Barrow; 1978), better known by his stage name Shyne, Belizean rapper and politician
Rabbi Natan Gamedze
Rabbi Issamar Ginzberg, Graduate of Ohr LaGola: Smicha program
Jonathan Rosenblum, Haredi author and spokesperson
Rabbi Natan Slifkin
Amar'e Stoudemire, basketball player/coach
Rabbi Asher Wade
Dr. Henry Abramson, historian

Programs
J.L.E. - Jewish Learning Exchange - Summer program includes tours of Israel and lectures
The Shoresh Program: Introduction to Talmud and Jewish thought
The Intermediate and Mechina Program: Beginner to Intermediate Talmud learning
The Beis Midrash Program: Advanced learning
Derech: One- or two-year post-high-school program
The Center Program: Intensive learning for college graduates (one- or two-year program)
Ohr LaGolah: Semikhah (ordination) program 
Chai Israel: A gap year program consisting of classes, internships, trips, volunteer work and experiences designed to emphasize Israeli culture. Rabbi Dani Zwick is the current program director.
Pisga:One- or two-year post-high-school program for South Africans and Australians.

References

External links
Ohr Somayach home page
Click here to download some MP3 lectures by Rabbi Yitzchak Breitowitz

Ohr Somayach
Orthodox yeshivas in Jerusalem
Baalei teshuva institutions